Eugenia Kim (born 1952) is a Korean American writer and novelist who lives in Washington, DC.

Works

Kim's debut novel, The Calligrapher's Daughter, won the 2009 Borders Original Voices Award for Fiction, and was shortlisted for the 2010 Dayton Literary Peace Prize.

The Calligrapher's Daughter received a Publishers Weekly (PW) starred review among other advance reviews. It was also published by Bloomsbury (UK), in January 2010, and has been translated and published in Indonesia and South Korea. Kim's epic historical novel, inspired by the life of her mother, is about a young woman who fights for a brighter future in early 20th-century Korea during the Japanese occupation. In addition to other press attention, including a less favorable review by the Smithsonian Bookdragon (see External links), The Calligrapher's Daughter was named Critic's Pick and a Best Book of 2009 by The Washington Post, and was a September 2009 Book Pick in Good Housekeeping magazine.

Her stories and essays were published by Potomac Review, APAJ—the former literary journal of the Asian American Writers Workshop, Our Bodies, Ourselves (2005 edition) and in anthologies, including Echoes Upon Echoes: New Korean American Writing, edited by Elaine H. Kim and Laura Hyun Yi. Kang. Her short story, "Orientation," was first runner-up in the 2001 F. Scott Fitzgerald Short Story Contest.

Kim's second novel, The Kinship of Secrets, was published by Houghton Mifflin Harcourt in November 2018.

Biography
The daughter of Korean immigrant parents who came to America shortly after the Pacific War, Kim was born in White Plains, New York and raised in Takoma Park, Maryland. She attended Central Connecticut State University (then College), and the University of Maryland, from which she received a BA in Studio Art. Following a long career in graphic design, she received her MFA in Writing and Literature from Bennington College in 2001.

In May, 2010, Kim presented at the American Studies Association of Korea, at the invitation of the U.S. Embassy in Seoul, South Korea, and at Sookmyung Women's University Library as part of an exhibition, "A Glimpse into the World of Korean American Literature." She has presented at the Library of Congress Asian American Association, the American Library Association, and elsewhere.

She teaches fiction at Fairfield University's MFA Creative Writing Program.

Awards
2009 Borders Original Voices Award for Fiction
Shortlisted, Dayton Literary Peace Prize, 2010
Mid Atlantic Arts Foundation Fellow, Millay Colony for the Arts
Eli Cantor Fellow, Yaddo
Fellow, Hedgebrook
Stanford Calderwood Fellow, The MacDowell Colony
Fellow, Virginia Center for the Creative Arts

References

External links
 Eugenia Kim website
 The Calligrapher's Daughter website
 The Washington Post, "A Woman of Consequence in a Time of War," book review, August 26, 2009
 The Christian Science Monitor, Book Reviews, August 21, 2009
 National Geographic Traveler, "Great Books, Great Journeys/New Book Roundups," August 2009
 Editor's Choice by The Denver Post, 08/02/2009
 Featured Book of Color Pick of the Day, Media Bistro/GalleyCat, August 4, 2009
 More.com, "At 57, A First Novel with Legs,"  August 2009
 More.com, "The Real Family behind 'The Calligrapher's Daughter'" 
 Red Room.com "Rising Star," August 2009
 Examiner.com/Washington DC, "Exquisite new novel tells of two daring women in early 20th century Korea," August 19, 2009
 San Francisco Chronicle, SFGate, Grabbers – first sentences from new books, August 23, 2009
 Milwaukee Journal Sentinel, "Kim traces courage in 'Calligrapher' Korean passage," August 29, 2009
 Bennington College News, "Eugenia Kim MFA '01 Garners Rave Reviews for Debut Novel"
 Washingtonian (magazine), "Washington Read," August 2009
 Smithsonian Asian Pacific American Program, BookDragon, Review, September 25, 2009
 The Washington Times, Book review, November 15, 2009
 About.com, Book review, January 3, 2010
 The Independent (UK), Book Review, February 14, 2010
 The Washington Post, "New paperbacks about living off the land," June 30, 2010
 World (magazine), "Summer Reading, 2010 Books Issue," July 3, 2010
 The Washington Times, Communities, Book Review, March 28, 2011

American women novelists
American writers of Korean descent
Bennington College alumni
Fairfield University faculty
Living people
1952 births
Writers from Washington, D.C.
21st-century American novelists
21st-century American women writers
Novelists from Connecticut
American women academics